Phlogis is a genus of leafhoppers in the family Cicadellidae.

References 

Cicadellidae genera
Cicadellidae
Taxa described in 1979